Chatham University is a private university in Pittsburgh, Pennsylvania. Originally founded as a women's college, it began enrolling men in undergraduate programs in 2015. It enrolls about 2,110 students, including 1,002 undergraduate students and 1,108 graduate students. The university grants certificates and degrees including bachelor, master, first-professional, and doctorate degrees in the School of Arts, Science & Business, the School of Health Sciences, and the Falk School of Sustainability & Environment.

History
Founded as the Pennsylvania Female College on December 11, 1869, by Reverend William Trimble Beatty (the father of renowned operatic contralto Louise Homer), Chatham was initially situated in the Berry mansion on Woodland Road off Fifth Avenue in the neighborhood of Shadyside. Shadyside Campus today is composed of buildings and grounds from a number of former private mansions, including those of Andrew Mellon, Edward Stanton Fickes, George M. Laughlin Jr. and James Rea. It was renamed Pennsylvania College for Women in 1890, and as Chatham College in 1955. The name served to honor William Pitt, 1st Earl of Chatham and namesake of the City of Pittsburgh. The school gained university status from the Pennsylvania Department of Education on April 23, 2007, and publicly announced its new status on May 1, 2007, changing its name to Chatham University.

With elements designed for the original Andrew Mellon estate by the Olmsted Brothers, the  Shadyside Campus was designated an arboretum in 1998 by the American Association of Botanical Gardens and Arboreta. It features over 115 different varieties of species, including Japanese Flowering Crabapple, River Birch and Kentucky Coffee Tree.

In 2005 the university expanded its programs to include online advanced degree programs (bachelors, masters, doctoral) through the School of Continuing Education, now the School for Continuing and Professional Studies. Two years later, Chatham's MFA in Creative Writing program was named one of the top five Innovative/Unique Programs by The Atlantic Monthly.

Chatham received some national attention in 2014 when it announced that it was engaging in a period of study "considering admitting men for the first time in that college's history," resulting in "reactions of surprise and anger" from its alumnae. Undergraduate men began attending in 2015.

The current president of Chatham University is David Finegold, DPhil. He became the 19th president in 2016, following the retirement of Dr. Esther Barazzone after a 24-year tenure.

Campuses
Chatham's original Shadyside Campus is part of historic Woodland Road. The Shadyside Campus now also includes the Chatham Eastside building, which serves as the home for the health science and interior architecture programs. 
 
The University's new  Eden Hall Campus is located north of the city of Pittsburgh in Richland Township, Pennsylvania; it is the home of Chatham's Falk School of Sustainability & Environment. Programs at Eden Hall Campus include a Bachelors in Sustainability, a Masters of Sustainability, an MA in Food Studies, and dual degrees in Masters of Sustainability or MA in Food Studies + Masters in Business Administration. The Eden Hall Campus was donated to Chatham University by the Eden Hall Foundation on May 1, 2008. In 2011, the University engaged the architectural team of Berkebile Nelson Immenschuh McDowell (BNIM) of Kansas City, Mo. and the landscape design firm Andropogon Associates of Philadelphia to lead the master planning process. The first phase of development was designed by the firm Mithun, was completed in 2016, and won an award for sustainable development.

In 2013, the Falk Foundation made its largest and final grant to the School of Sustainability & the Environment for the completion of the Eden Hall Campus. The grant was also the largest grant in the history of Chatham University. The School of Sustainability & the Environment was renamed the Falk School of Sustainability. The Falk Foundation made its first grant to Chatham in 1952 with the funding of Chatham's Falk Hall, named in honor of Laura Falk, wife of foundation founder Maurice Falk.

Academics

The university structure includes three distinctive Colleges: Chatham College houses academic and co-curricular programs for undergraduate men and women and embodies the traditions and rituals of the traditional liberal arts college. The College for Graduate Studies offers women and men both masters and doctoral programs. Programs within the College for Graduate Studies include concentrations in art and architecture, business, health sciences, teaching and creative writing. The College for Continuing and Professional Studies, formerly the School of Continuing Education, provides online and hybrid undergraduate and graduate degree programs for women and men, certificate programs, and community programming including the Summer Music and Arts Day Camp.

Accreditation
Chatham University is accredited by the Middle States Commission on Higher Education.

Outreach centers
 Center for Women's Entrepreneurship
 Global Focus/International Programs
 Pennsylvania Center for Women and Politics
 Pittsburgh Teachers Institute
 Rachel Carson Institute (honoring Rachel Carson, Class of 1929)
 Independent Monitoring for Quality (IM4Q)

Athletics
Chatham University teams, also known as the Cougars, participate as a member of the NCAA Division III. The Cougars are a member of the Presidents' Athletic Conference (PAC). Women's sports include basketball, cross country, ice hockey, lacrosse, soccer, softball, swimming & diving, track & field, and volleyball. Men's sports include baseball, basketball, cross country, ice hockey, lacrosse, swimming & diving, track & field, and, beginning in fall 2019, soccer. Men's and women's ice hockey play in the United Collegiate Hockey Conference.

The women's ice hockey team was the first NCAA women's ice hockey team in Pennsylvania.

The college mascot was previously Pennsy the Seal. The cougar mascot was adopted in 1992 and was named Carson in honor of alumna Rachel Carson in 2011.

Notable alumni

Muriel Bowser, mayor of Washington, D.C.
 Rachel Carson, biologist and zoologist
Catherine Chisholm Cushing, playwright
Meredith Dixon, member of the New Mexico House of Representatives
Kathie L. Olsen, former deputy director of the National Science Foundation
Elaine Scarry, author and Walter M. Cabot Professor of Aesthetics and the General Theory of Value at Harvard University
Lea Wait, author of mystery novels and children's books
Lesley Brooks Wells, United States district judge
Mildred Weston, author and composer
Jean Swantco (Wiseman), Member and general counsel for the Twelve Tribes communities
Margaret Scully Zimmele, artist

Points of interest
Chatham College Arboretum

References

External links

 
Educational institutions established in 1869
Liberal arts colleges in Pennsylvania
Former women's universities and colleges in the United States
Universities and colleges in Pittsburgh
1869 establishments in Pennsylvania
Private universities and colleges in Pennsylvania
History of women in Pennsylvania